The R432 road is a regional road in Ireland, which runs north–south from the R430 in Abbeyleix, County Laois to the N77 in Ballyragget, County Kilkenny.

See also
Roads in Ireland
National primary road
National secondary road

References
Roads Act 1993 (Classification of Regional Roads) Order 2006 – Department of Transport

Regional roads in the Republic of Ireland
Roads in County Kilkenny
Roads in County Laois